Tianwa Yang (born April 8, 1987) is a Chinese classical violinist.

Biography and career 
Tianwa Yang began learning to play the violin at age four, and quickly began winning violin competitions. At age ten, she began studying with Professor Lin Yaoji at the Central Conservatory of Music in Beijing, and already was receiving media attention for the quality of her playing. After she performed at the 1999 Beijing Music Festival, violinist Isaac Stern invited her to play with him in the United States.

Yang debuted in Europe in 2001, performing with the Czech Broadcasting Symphony Orchestra in Prague. In 2003, she performed Prokofiev’s Concerto No. 2 in Munich with the Orchestra of the Bayerische Staatsoper, and followed this with recitals in Paris, Stockholm, Frankfurt and Vienna. Also in 2003, Yang was awarded a special two-year scholarship by the German Academic Exchange Service (DAAD) to study chamber music in Germany. Yang's North American debut was in the 2007-2008 season, when she performed at the Virginia Arts Festival with the Virginia Symphony. She also have her debut performance at Berlin Philharmonic Hall, that same year, which was broadcast live by Deutschland Radio. She gave recitals in Switzerland and France, and carried out an extensive tour of Germany with Klassische Philharmonie Bonn.

Yang recorded her first CD in 2000, at the age of 13, with a recording of Paganini's 24 Caprices, on the Hugo Classical label. In 2004, she began recording for Naxos, beginning a series of the complete works of Pablo de Sarasate, which will eventually cover 8 CDs. She has also recorded works by Piazzolla and Vivaldi.

References

External links

 Tianwa Yang's biography and discography on the Naxos web site
 Tianwa Yang's web site

Chinese classical violinists
1987 births
Living people
Child classical musicians
21st-century classical violinists
Women classical violinists